Polycyrtus vierecki is a species of wasp in the subfamily Cryptinae. It is found in Peru.

References

External links 
 Polycyrtus vierecki at insectoid.info

Cryptinae
Insects described in 1966
Fauna of Peru